Pastona is a genus of moths of the family Noctuidae.

Species
 Pastona camptosema (Hampson, 1918)
 Pastona glycera (Druce, 1889)
 Pastona goniophora (Schaus, 1903)
 Pastona leucosema (Hampson, 1918)
 Pastona nigropuncta (Druce, 1898)
 Pastona pusilla (Schaus, 1894)
 Pastona rudis Walker, 1858

References
Natural History Museum Lepidoptera genus database
Pastona at funet

Hadeninae